French submarine Monge (Q67) was one of 18 s built for the French Navy in the first decade in the 20th century.

Design and description
The Pluviôse class were built as part of the French Navy's 1905 building program to a double-hull design by Maxime Laubeuf. The submarines displaced  surfaced and  submerged. Their crew numbered 2 officers and 23 enlisted men.
  
For surface running, the boats were powered by two  triple-expansion steam engines, each driving one propeller shaft using steam provided by two Du Temple boilers. When submerged each propeller was driven by a  electric motor.

The first six boats completed were armed with a single  internal bow torpedo tube, but this was deleted from the rest of the submarines after an accident with their sister  in 1909. All of the boats were fitted with six 450 mm external torpedo launchers; the pair firing forward were fixed outwards at an angle of seven degrees and the rear pair had an angle of five degrees. Following a ministerial order on 22 February 1910, the aft tubes were reversed so they too fired forward, but at an angle of eight degrees. The other launchers were a rotating pair of Drzewiecki drop collars in a single mount positioned on top of the hull at the stern. They could traverse 150 degrees to each side of the boat. The Pluviôse-class submarines carried eight torpedoes.

Construction and career
Monge, named after the 18th-century mathematician and Minister of Marine Gaspard Monge, was ordered on 24 August 1905 from the Arsenal de Toulon. The submarine was laid down in 1906, launched on 31 December 1908 and commissioned on 2 August 1910.

At the outbreak of the First World War Monge was part of the French Mediterranean Fleet and sailed with that force to the Adriatic tasked with bringing the Austro-Hungarian Fleet to battle or blockading it in its home ports.

On 29 December 1915, while on patrol off Cattaro under the command of Lieutenant Roland Morillot during the Battle of Durazzo, Monge sighted the cruiser  and an escorting destroyer. She closed to attack, but was spotted and rammed by Helgoland. She surfaced and was abandoned, her commander staying aboard to ensure she sank. For this action Morillot was honoured by having a submarine, the captured German UB-26, renamed after him.

Notes

Bibliography

External links
 Castel, Marc: Monge at Sous-marins Français 1863 -, pagesperso-orange.fr (French)
 Sieche, Erwin: French naval operations in the Adriatic at gwpda.org

Pluviôse-class submarines
World War I submarines of France
1908 ships
Ships built in France
World War I shipwrecks in the Adriatic Sea
Maritime incidents in 1915